Hittinahalli may refer to the following places in Bijapur district of Karnataka, India:

Hittinahalli, Bijapur, village in the Bijapur taluk
Hittinahalli, Sindgi, village in the Sindgi taluk